Nigel Loring may refer to:

 Sir Neil Loring (1320–1386), also Nigel, medieval English soldier and diplomat
 Sir Nigel Loring (surgeon) (1896–1979), apothecary to British royalty
 Sir Nigel Loring, a character from Sir Nigel and The White Company